Carl N. Hodges (March 19, 1937 – April 3, 2021) was an American atmospheric physicist and founder of the Seawater foundation. He was the main driving force behind ideas of using sea canals to irrigate deserts.

The idea is to grow sea farms in the artificial sea canals using plants like salicornia and mangrove, and introducing fish and shrimp. This is thought to be able to resurrect ecosystems, create jobs, wealth and food sources. This has been proposed as a solution for starvation and even being able to counter the effects of global warming and rising sea levels.

He was a primary consultant on development of the Epcot attraction, Listen to the Land.

References

External links

2021 deaths
21st-century American physicists
American atmospheric scientists
Atmospheric physicists
People involved with desert greening
1937 births